This is a list of moths of the family Xyloryctidae that are found in India. It also acts as an index to the species articles and forms part of the full List of moths of India.

Amorbaea hepatica Meyrick, 1908
Comocritis circulata (Meyrick, 1918)
Comocritis cyanobactra Meyrick, 1922
Comocritis enneora (Meyrick, 1914)
Comocritis olympia Meyrick, 1894
Comocritis pieria Meyrick, 1906
Epichostis antigama (Meyrick, 1908)
Epichostis cryphaea (Meyrick, 1908)
Epichostis leucorma (Meyrick, 1908)
Epichostis stelota (Meyrick, 1908)
Epichostis tympanias (Meyrick, 1908)
Eumenodora tetrachorda Meyrick, 1924
Hermogenes aliferella Zeller, 1867
Linoclostis gonatias Meyrick, 1908
Metathrinca ceromorpha (Meyrick, 1923)
Metathrinca illuvialis (Meyrick, 1914)
Neospastis calpidias Meyrick, 1917
Neospastis encryphias (Meyrick, 1907)
Neospastis ichnaea (Meyrick, 1914)
Metathrinca parabola (Meyrick, 1914)
Opisina arenosella Walker, 1864
Synchalara byrsina (Meyrick, 1907)
Synchalara rhombota (Meyrick, 1907)
Synchalara minax (Meyrick, 1907)
Thymiatris melitacma Meyrick, 1907
Thymiatris seriosa Diakonoff, 1966
Trypherantis atelogramma Meyrick, 1907

References

 

M